Premakumar Gunaratnam in politics, is a former JVP leader and political activist in Sri Lanka who later became an Australian citizen and the current general secretary of FLSP.

Early life
Gunaratnam was born on 18 November 1965 to Aadheemoolam Pillai Gunaratnam from Alaveddy in Jaffna, and Valliamma Rajamany from Kegalle. He was educated in St. Mary's College, Kegalle, and Pinnawala Central College, Rambukkana. He entered the University of Peradeniya Faculty of Engineering and became a student leader within a short while after entering the university. He did not complete his degree; although his profession is stated as an "Engineer". He is married to a Sinhalese doctor, Champa Somaratna, a resident in Australia.

Politics with JVP
During 1988–1989, Gunaratnam functioned as the Trincomalee leader of Deshapremi Janatha Viyaparaya (DJV), he was also the contact point between the JVP and Tamil groups of Marxist orientation. Touted as an explosives expert, he allegedly masterminded the JVP attack on the Pallekele army camp and several other attacks. After the death of Ranjitham, Prema- kumar operated under his brother's name. He was arrested and imprisoned at Bogambara Prison but escaped tunnelling his way out of prison on 13 December 1988. Subsequently, he fled the country, reportedly via the sea route as the military launched a manhunt.

Post-JVP politics
Gunaratnam was an elusive leader and JVP leaders denied the existence of a party member as "Premakumar Gunaratnam". In April 2012, internal crisis within the party heated up between the hard core socialist Gunaratnam and the party leader Somawansa Amarasinghe. As a result, the party's media unit was shut down once a majority of the members extended their support to Gunarathnam. The women's wing and a majority of the students’ and youth wings have extended their support to Gunaratnam group.

A former politburo member, Dimuthu Attygalle, who is now an active member of the dissident group, was the former head of the JVP women's wing and the party leader for several districts. Another former politburo member Pubudu Jagoda was an active member in the youth movement that includes the education wing. He also played a key role in the JVP newspaper, Lanka. Several student union leaders like Duminda Nagamuwa, Udul Premaratne and Chameera Koswatte have also sided with Gunaratnam group. In the same month Gunaratnam and the dissident group formed new Marxist party named Frontline Socialist Party (FSP).

Wanted status 

The Ministry of External Affairs said that Gunaratnam was in violation of immigration laws and for that he was deported. Police spokesman SP Ajith Rohana said that Gunaratnam was not wanted by the law.

Arrest and release 

Gunaratnam was arrested in November 2015 for violating Immigration and Emigration Laws after arriving in the country on a tourist visa. He was released on 2 December 2016 after serving his prison term. He received Sri Lankan citizenship in February 2017 and was directed to remove his Australian citizenship.

Notes

References

1965 births
Living people
Sri Lankan criminals
People deported from Sri Lanka
Australian people of Sri Lankan Tamil descent
Sri Lankan emigrants to Australia
Janatha Vimukthi Peramuna politicians